Thamnophis brachystoma, the shorthead garter snake or short-headed gartersnake, is a small species of colubrid. The species is endemic to the northeastern United States.

Geographic range
T. brachystoma is found in small pockets in northwestern Pennsylvania and southwestern New York. Outside of its natural range, there is an introduced population in Pittsburgh in southwestern Pennsylvania, as well as Youngstown, Mahoning County, Ohio.

Etymology
The specific name brachystoma comes from the Greek words brachy, meaning short, and stoma, meaning mouth.

Description
There is no apparent distinction between the body and head. Unlike Thamnophis sirtalis, there are no black spots between stripes in T. brachystoma. Dorsal coloration tends to be olive or olive-green with three (1 dorsal, 2 lateral) beige to yellow stripes running the length of the body. There is a distinct sexual dimorphism in this species with females being larger than males.

Habitat
The shorthead garter snake is commonly found in old fields and meadows, but can occasionally be found in wooded areas. It is almost always found within several hundred meters of a field. It is believed that on sunny days it will be openly basking; however, when a population study was conducted, it was almost invariably found under objects such as wood and rocks. Individuals were only encountered in the open on cloudy days.

Behavior
T. brachystoma is slow to bite would be handlers, but will readily expel musk and feces from the cloaca. Shorthead garter snakes can commonly be found near one another under cover objects, with no apparent correlation to seasonality or breeding cycles.

Diet
In the wild, T. brachystoma feeds exclusively on earthworms. However, in captivity shorthead garter snakes may consume other food items such as leeches, salamanders, frogs, and fish. Prior to the introduction of non-native earthworms to North America, T. brachystoma would have primarily fed on native earthworms that were restricted to the unglaciated Allegheny Plateau.

Reproduction
Reproduction in T. brachystoma occurs in spring shortly after emerging from the hibernacula. Females generally emerge with ovarian follicles already well developed. Females in New York breed every other year while females in Pennsylvania breed annually. Males use stored sperm for breeding. The testes are small after emergence, reaching full size by midsummer. After this point, sperm will be stored for later use in the spring. T. brachystoma is believed to be viviparous, with experiments showing a transfer of amino acids between mother and offspring.

References

Further reading
Behler JL, King FW (1979). The Audubon Society Field Guide to North American Reptiles and Amphibians. New York: Alfred A. Knopf. 743 pp. . (Thamnophis brachystoma, pp. 663–664).
Conant R (1975). A Field Guide to Reptiles and Amphibians of Eastern and Central North America. Boston: Houghton Mifflin. xviii + 429 pp. + Plates 1-48.  (hardcover),  (paperback). (Thamnophis brachystoma, pp. 161–162 + Plate 23 + Map 113).
Cope ED (1892). "A New Species of Eutænia from Western Pennsylvania". American Naturalist 26: 964-965. (Eutænia brachystoma, new species).
McCoy CJ (1980). Identification Guide to Pennsylvania Snakes. (Design and illustrations by Michael Antonoplos). Pittsburgh: Carnegie Museum of Natural History. 12 pp. (Thamnophis brachystoma, p. 7).
Netting MG, Richmond ND (editors) (1970). Pennsylvania Reptiles and Amphibians. Third Edition, Fifth Printing. (Photographs by Hal H. Harrison). Harrisburg, Pennsylvania: Pennsylvania Fish Commission. 24 pp. (Thamnophis brachystoma, p. 2).
Smith, Albert G. (1945). "The Status of Thamnophis butleri Cope, and a Redescription of Thamnophis brachystoma (Cope)". Proc. Biol. Soc. Washington 58: 147-154. (Thamnophis brachystoma, new combination).
Smith HM, Brodie ED Jr (1982). Reptiles of North America: A Guide to Field Identification. New York: Golden Press. 240 pp. . (Thamnophis brachystoma, pp. 146–147).
Wright AH, Wright AA (1957). Handbook of Snakes of the United States and Canada. Ithaca and London: Comstock Publishing Associates, a division of Cornell University Press. 1,105 pp. (in 2 volumes), 305 figures. (Thamnophis radix brachystoma, pp. 813-816 + Map 58 on p. 763).

Thamnophis
Reptiles of the United States
Reptiles described in 1892
Taxa named by Edward Drinker Cope